Elasticity of substitution is the ratio of percentage change in capital-labour ratio with the percentage change in Marginal Rate of Technical Substitution.  In a competitive market, it measures the percentage change in the two inputs used in response to a percentage change in their prices. It gives a measure of the curvature of an isoquant, and thus, the substitutability between inputs (or goods), i.e. how easy it is to substitute one input (or good) for the other.

History of the concept
John Hicks introduced the concept in 1932. Joan Robinson independently discovered it in 1933 using a mathematical formulation that was equivalent to Hicks's, though that was not implemented at the time.

Definition
The elasticity of substitution is the change in the ratio of the use of two goods with respect to the ratio of their marginal values or prices. Another application is to the ratio of consumption goods 1 and 2 with respect to the ratio of their marginal utilities or their prices. We will start with the consumption application. 

Then the elasticity of substitution is:

where  is the marginal rate of substitution. (These differentials are taken along the isoquant that passes through the base point. Because of this constraint, the MRS and the ratio of inputs are one-to-one functions of each other under suitable convexity assumptions.) The last equality presents , where  are the prices of goods 1 and 2. This is a relationship from the first order condition for a consumer utility maximization problem in Arrow–Debreu interior equilibrium, where the marginal utilities of two goods are proportional to prices. Intuitively we are looking at how a consumer's choices over consumption items change as their relative prices change.

Note also that :

An equivalent characterization of the elasticity of substitution is:

Similarly, if the production function is  then the elasticity of substitution is:

where  is the marginal rate of technical substitution.

The inverse of elasticity of substitution is elasticity of complementarity.

Example
Consider Cobb–Douglas production function .

The marginal rate of technical substitution is

It is convenient to change the notations. Denote

Rewriting this we have

Then the elasticity of substitution is

Economic interpretation

Given an original allocation/combination and a specific substitution on allocation/combination for the original one, the larger the magnitude of the elasticity of substitution (the marginal rate of substitution elasticity of the relative allocation) means the more likely to substitute. There are always 2 sides to the market; here we are talking about the receiver, since the elasticity of preference is that of the receiver.

The elasticity of substitution also governs how the relative expenditure on goods or factor inputs changes as relative prices change. That is:

As the relative price  changes, relative expenditure changes according to:

Thus, whether or not an increase in the relative price of  leads to an increase or decrease in the relative expenditure on  depends on whether the elasticity of substitution is less than or greater than one.

Which of these effects dominates depends on the magnitude of the elasticity of substitution. When the elasticity of substitution is less than one, the first effect dominates: relative demand for  falls, but by proportionally less than the rise in its relative price, so that relative expenditure rises. In this case, the goods are gross complements.

Conversely, when the elasticity of substitution is greater than one, the second effect dominates: the reduction in relative quantity exceeds the increase in relative price, so that relative expenditure on  falls. In this case, the goods are gross substitutes.

See also
Constant elasticity of substitution
Marginal rate of technical substitution

Notes

References
 First defined there.

External links
The Elasticity of Substitution, Gonçalo L. Fonsekca, essay, The New School for Social Research.

Consumer theory
Elasticity (economics)
1932 in economics